The Estadio Mariano Matamoros is a multi-use stadium in Xochitepec.  It is currently used mostly for football matches and is the home stadium for Ángeles SUD  F.C. Morelos of Liga Premier de México – Serie B. The stadium has a capacity of 16,000 people.

References

External links

Estadio Mariano Matamoros
Sports venues in Morelos
Athletics (track and field) venues in Mexico